George Lerner (1922–1995) was an American inventor known for inventing Mr. Potato Head.

Biography
Lerner was born in Brooklyn, New York and worked during his lifetime as an artist, graphic designer, and model maker. In 1949, he designed and produced a first generation set of plastic face pieces. The push pin shaped noses, ears, eyes, and mouth parts could be pushed into fruits or vegetables to transform the food into playmates. The toy did not take off at first because post-World War II consumers didn't like the idea of wasting food by playing with it. Lerner finally sold the toy for $5,000 to a cereal company. The toys were planned to be a premium giveaway in cereal boxes. But when Lerner found a better deal offered by toy manufacturer Hassenfeld Brothers (now Hasbro), Lerner and the manufacturer bought the rights back for $7,000. Hasbro officially named the toy, Mr. Potato Head.

In 1964 and 1975, George Lerner's original designs got their plastic head and size upgrades respectively, in order to comply with government issued safety regulations.

Lerner died in 1995.

Personal life
Lerner was Jewish, and was of Romanian-Jewish descent.

References

Toy inventors
1922 births
American people of Romanian-Jewish descent
1995 deaths
20th-century American businesspeople
20th-century American inventors
20th-century American Jews
Mr. Potato Head